Ephram of Jerusalem was a 2nd-century Jewish Christian bishop of Jerusalem.

According to the church Historian Eusebius of Caesarea, there were fifteen bishops of Jerusalem, all Jewish Christians, who ruled the church in Jerusalem up till the Bar Kokhba's revolt, and he was 12th on that list. Exact dates are not given by Eusebius, for his bishopric but it was between 124 and 135 AD.

References 

2nd-century bishops of Jerusalem
Year of birth unknown